The 1934 West Ham Upton by-election was held on 14 May 1934.  The by-election was held due to the resignation of the incumbent Conservative MP, Alfred Chotzner.  It was won by the Labour candidate Benjamin Walter Gardner.

Result

Previous result

References

Upton by-election
Upton by-election
1930s in Essex
Upton by-election
Upton,1934
Upton,1934
Upton,1934